Absolute Power is a 1997 American political action thriller film produced by, directed by, and starring Clint Eastwood as a master jewel thief who witnesses the killing of a woman by Secret Service agents. The screenplay by William Goldman is based on the 1996 novel Absolute Power by David Baldacci. Screened at the 1997 Cannes Film Festival, the film also stars Gene Hackman, Ed Harris, Laura Linney, Judy Davis, Scott Glenn, Dennis Haysbert, and Richard Jenkins. It was also the last screen appearance of E. G. Marshall. The scenes in the museum were filmed in the Walters Art Museum.

Plot 
Master thief and burglar Luther Whitney breaks into the mansion of billionaire Walter Sullivan but is forced to hide upon the arrival of Sullivan's wife Christy, on a drunken rendezvous with Alan Richmond, the President of the United States. Hidden behind the bedroom vault's one-way mirror, Whitney watches in horror as Richmond, who is a sadist, becomes sexually violent; Christy, in self-defense, wounds his arm with a letter opener. Richmond screams for help, and Secret Service agents Bill Burton and Tim Collin burst in, see Christy about to stab the President, and fatally shoot her. Chief of Staff Gloria Russell arrives, and they stage the scene to look like a burglary gone wrong. Whitney is unnoticed until he makes his getaway, pursued by the agents, but he manages to escape with millions in valuables as well as the incriminating letter opener.

Detective Seth Frank heads the murder investigation. Though Whitney, known to authorities as a high-profile burglar, becomes a prime suspect, Frank does not believe he is a murderer because he was never a violent criminal. Burton asks Frank to keep him informed on the case and wiretaps Frank's office telephone. Just as Whitney is about to flee the country, he sees Richmond on television publicly commiserating with Sullivan – a close friend and financial supporter of the president – on his loss. Incensed, Whitney decides to bring Richmond to justice. He taunts Russell, leaving her a photograph of the letter opener.

Whitney's estranged daughter Kate, a prosecutor, accompanies Frank to Whitney's home in search of clues. Together with Kate, for whom he feels a growing attraction, Seth enters Luther's townhouse and Kate sees the numerous photos of her that line her father's house, including photos where she did not know he was there, which moves her deeply. But the suspicion that he might be Christy Sullivan's murderer gnaws heavily on her and she agrees to set her father up, arranging a meeting at an outdoor café where the police can take him into custody. Frank guarantees Whitney's safety, but Burton learns of the plan through the wiretap, and both Collin and McCarty – a hitman hired by a vengeful Sullivan – prepare to kill Whitney. The two snipers, each unaware of the other, try to shoot Whitney when he meets with Kate. Whitney escapes disguised as a police officer. Whitney later explains to Kate exactly how Christy was killed and by whom.

Whitney tricks Russell into wearing Christy's diamond necklace during a White House event. Suspecting that Kate must know the truth, Richmond decides she must be eliminated. When Whitney learns from Frank that the Secret Service has taken over surveillance of Kate, he races back to Washington, D.C. to protect her. Collins then begins ramming Kate's car near a cliff edge, Whitney arrives and pins Collin's vehicle but not before Kate's car falls off a cliff, but she survives. Collin tries again to kill Kate at the hospital with a poison-filled syringe, but Whitney subdues him with a syringe of his own. Collin pleads for mercy, but Whitney delivers a fatal dose.

Whitney replaces Sullivan's chauffeur and tells Sullivan what truly happened the night his wife was killed. Sullivan is unconvinced until Whitney explains how Richmond lied in his speech about Christy's excuse for staying home that night, which he could only have learned from her. He gives Sullivan the letter opener with Richmond's blood and fingerprints and tells him that he has since returned the stolen items.

Whitney drops Sullivan off outside the White House. Sullivan passes through security with the letter opener and enters the Oval Office. Meanwhile, alerted by Whitney that his phone has been bugged, Frank discovers that a remorseful Burton has committed suicide and uses the evidence Burton left behind to arrest Russell. On television, the next morning comes the shocking news from Sullivan that Richmond committed suicide by stabbing himself to death. Though not confirmed, it is suggested that Richmond died by Sullivan's hand or Richmond did in fact commit suicide to avoid punishment for his crimes. Whitney is satisfied that justice has prevailed, and happy his daughter is safe and part of his life again.

At the hospital, Whitney watches over Kate's recovery. Detective Frank visits briefly, whereupon Whitney suggests to Kate that Frank join them for supper sometime.

Cast 

 Clint Eastwood as Luther Whitney
 Gene Hackman as President Richmond
 Ed Harris as Seth Frank
 Laura Linney as Kate Whitney
 Scott Glenn as Bill Burton
 Dennis Haysbert as Tim Collin
 Judy Davis as Gloria Russell
 E. G. Marshall as Walter Sullivan
 Melora Hardin as Christy Sullivan
 Kenneth Welsh as Sandy Lord
 Penny Johnson as Laura Simon
 Richard Jenkins as Michael McCarty
 Mark Margolis as Red Brandsford

Production 
The worldwide book and film rights to the novel were sold for a reported $5 million. William Goldman was hired to write the screenplay in late 1994. He worked on several drafts through 1995, which he later described in his memoir Which Lie Did I Tell?

When Eastwood first heard of the book being turned into a film, he liked the basic plot and the characters, but disliked that most of those he considered interesting were killed off.  He requested that Goldman make sure that "everyone the audience likes doesn't get killed off." Absolute Power was filmed between June and August 1996.

Among the Washington, D.C. locations used for filming was the apartment of journalist Christopher Hitchens.

Reception

Critical reception 
Absolute Power was met with mixed reviews from critics. In her review in The New York Times, Janet Maslin gave it a mixed review, writing, "Mr. Eastwood directs a sensible-looking genre film with smooth expertise, but its plot is quietly berserk." Maslin goes on to write, "Mr. Eastwood's own performance sets a high-water mark for laconic intelligence and makes the star seem youthfully spry by joking so much about his age."

On the aggregate reviewer web site Rotten Tomatoes, the film received a "Rotten" 56% rating from top film critics based on 57 reviews. The site's consensus states: "Absolute Power collapses under its preposterous plotting despite an all-star cast and Clint Eastwood's deft direction."

Box office 
The film was not a box office success domestically, grossing $16,770,220 on its opening weekend. The film earned a total domestic box office gross of $50,068,310.

Soundtrack 
The soundtrack to Absolute Power was released on March 11, 1997.

References 
 Citations

 Bibliography

External links 

 
 
 
 
 
 

1997 films
1997 action thriller films
1997 crime thriller films
1990s English-language films
1990s political thriller films
American action thriller films
American crime thriller films
American political thriller films
Political action films
Castle Rock Entertainment films
Columbia Pictures films
Films about fictional presidents of the United States
Films about the United States Secret Service
Films based on American crime novels
Films directed by Clint Eastwood
Films produced by Clint Eastwood
Films scored by Lennie Niehaus
Films set in Washington, D.C.
Films shot in Baltimore
Films shot in Washington, D.C.
Films with screenplays by William Goldman
Malpaso Productions films
1990s American films